Francis de Sales (1567–1622) was the bishop of Geneva.

Francis de Sales or Saint Francis de Sales may also refer to:
Francis De Sales (actor) (1912–1988), American actor
Cathedral of St. Francis de Sales (disambiguation)
St Francis de Sales College, Mount Barker, South Australia
St. Francis de Sales' Church (disambiguation)
St. Francis de Sales High School (disambiguation)
St. Francis De Sales Regional Catholic School, Herkimer, New York, United States
St Francis de Sales Regional College, Leeton, New South Wales, Australia
St Francis de Sales School, Dhemaji, Assam, India
St Francis de Sales, Hampton Hill and Upper Teddington, a Roman Catholic church in Hampton Hill, Richmond upon Thames, London

See also 
St. Francis (disambiguation)